The Gin Boomerang is a South Korean single-place, paraglider that was designed by Gin Seok Song and produced by Gin Gliders of Yongin. In 2016 it remained in production as the Boomerang 10.

Design and development
The Boomerang was designed as a competition glider. The design has progressed through ten generations of models as of 2016, the original Boomerang and then the Boomerang 2 through 10, each improving on the last. The models are each named for their relative size.

The Boomerang 10 is made from Porcher Sport Skytex 32g/27g cloth on the upper surface, with Porcher Sport Skytex 27g on the lower wing surface. The ribs are Porcher Sport Skytex 40g/32g. The upper lines are Edelrid 8000/9200, with the middle and lower lines all Edelrid 8000.

Variants

Specifications (Boomerang 3 L)

References

External links

Boomerang
Paragliders